Sangabad (also Romanized as Sangābād; also known as Sanava, Sanjabad, Sanjābād, and Sendzhava) is a village in Sanjabad-e Gharbi Rural District, in the Central District of Kowsar County, Ardabil Province, Iran. At the 2006 census, its population was 1,078, in 216 families.

References 

Tageo

Towns and villages in Kowsar County